Bunkpurugu is one of the constituencies represented in the Parliament of Ghana. It elects one Member of Parliament (MP) by the first past the post system of election. Bunkpurugu is located in the Bunkpurugu-Yunyoo District of the North East Region of Ghana.

Members of Parliament

See also
Bunkpurugu-Yunyoo (Ghana parliament constituency)

References 

Parliamentary constituencies in the North East Region (Ghana)